At Last is a 2003 album by American singer Cyndi Lauper. The album consists of a collection of cover versions of jazz standards songs, in addition to a cover of a contemporary song re-arranged into a jazz song. The album features a duet with Tony Bennett on "Makin' Whoopee" and was co-produced by Lauper with Russ Titelman. The US long box was available only at Costco or Sam's Club shops within the first two weeks when it was released. In 2008, while promoting her album Bring Ya to the Brink, Lauper said in an interview with the Brazilian newspaper Extra, that the album was a special project, with the intervention of the record company and that she does not consider it as a "career album".

The album was well received by the public and music critics. The website AllMusic and the Slant Magazine praised the album and gave it three stars out of five. The album debuted at #38 on the Billboard 200 with 47,000 copies sold in its first week, while the song "Walk On By" S.A.F. was #10 in Billboards Hot Dance Club Play and the Eddie X Mixes version hit the same chart at #15.

To promote the album, Cyndi headlined VH1 Divas Live 2004 alongside such artists as Patti LaBelle and Debbie Harry, performing "Stay" with Sheila E. on percussion. By 2012, it had sold 276,000 copies in the United States, according to Nielsen SoundScan.

Track listing

Personnel
Russ Titelman - producer
Cyndi Lauper - producer
William Wittman - mixing
Russ Titelman - mixing
George Fullan - mix assistant
Steve Gaboury - engineer
Sharon Tucker - assistant engineer
Peter Doris - assistant engineer
Tim Stritmater - assistant engineer
Brian Dozoretz - assistant engineer
Jason Finkel - assistant engineer
Elizabeth Collins - assistant engineer
Kurt Marks - assistant engineer
Jill Dell'Abate - production manager, contractor
Ted Jensen - mastering
Ryan Smith - mastering
Lisa Barbaris - management
David Massey - A&R
Evan L - A&R coordinator

Charts

Release history

References

Cyndi Lauper albums
2003 albums
Covers albums
Albums produced by Russ Titelman
Epic Records albums
Traditional pop albums
Daylight Records albums

es:At Last